The Pataudi family is an Indian show business family, primarily working India's Hindi film industry, commonly known as 'Bollywood'.

They are also noted as the family of erstwhile nawabs of the former princely state of Pataudi, from which they take their name. The first nawab was Faiz Talab Khan, an ethnic Pashtun from the Sarbani tribe of Kandahar, Afghanistan, who became the first Nawab of the Pataudi State in 1804, after he aided the British East India Company in their battle against the Maratha Empire, during the Second Anglo-Maratha War. 

His descendants subsequently ruled the state until 1949 , when it was merged with East Punjab and acceded to Dominion of India. The Pataudis retained their titles and were granted privy purses until both were abolished by the Indian government in 1971. The last ruling nawab was Iftikhar Ali Khan Pataudi and the last recognised titular nawab was his son Mansoor Ali Khan Pataudi. The current patriarch of the family is Saif Ali Khan.

Both Iftikhar Ali Khan Pataudi and Mansoor Ali Khan Pataudi were cricket players and played for, and also captained, the Indian national cricket team; the former had also played for the England cricket team in 1930s. The present members of the family consist mostly of actors who work predominantly in the Hindi film industry.

Notable members
Iftikhar Ali Khan Pataudi - 8th Nawab of Pataudi - cricket player; married Sajida Sultan, titular Nawab Begum of Bhopal
Mansoor Ali Khan, 9th and Last  Nawab of Pataudi - cricket player; son of Iftikhar Ali Khan and Sajida Sultan; married actress Sharmila Tagore
 Saif Ali Khan, - actor; current patriarch of the family, son of Mansoor Ali Khan and Sharmila Tagore; married actress Amrita Singh, in 1991 and divorced 2004; married to actress Kareena Kapoor Khan,
 Sara Ali Khan - actress; daughter of Saif Ali Khan and Amrita Singh, (b. 1995)
 Soha Ali Khan - actress; daughter of Mansoor Ali Khan and Sharmila Tagore; married to actor Kunal Khemu.
 Saba Ali Khan - jewellery designer; daughter of Mansoor Ali Khan and Sharmila Tagore

Notable relatives
 Saad Bin Jung - cricketer
 Sher Ali Khan Pataudi - Major General in the Pakistan Army
Ali Khan - Professor of Anthropology in LUMS
Shahryar Khan - Former diplomat and Chairman of Pakistan Cricket Board

See also
Nawabs of Pataudi

References

Indian families